Alvaldi (also Ölvaldi; Old Norse 'all-powerful') is a jötunn in Norse mythology, presented as the father of Þjazi.
Saturn's moon Alvaldi is named after him.

Name 
The Old Norse name Alvadi means 'all-powerful'. The name Ölvadi, found in Skáldskaparmál, appears to be a variant form referring to the same character.

Attestations 
In Hárbarðsljóð (Lay of Hárbarðr), Alvadi is mentioned as the father of the jötunn Þjazi.

In Skáldskaparmál (Language of Poetry), he is named Ölvadi and portrayed as the father of Þjazi, Gangr and Iði. Described as "very rich in gold", Ölvadi divides the inheritance among his sons in such a way that each may take the same mouthful of gold. According to philologist Rudolf Simek, the story is probably the remnant of an old myth.

References

Bibliography 

 
 

Jötnar